Pioneer Island is part of the Severnaya Zemlya group in the Russian Arctic.
It measures  in area. The island was discovered by Georgy Ushakov and Nikolay Urvantsev during their 1930-32 expedition.

This island contains the Pioneer Glacier.

Geological and biological data:  &

See also
 List of islands of Russia

References

External links

Islands of the Kara Sea
Islands of Severnaya Zemlya